M.I.B (known as Most Incredible Busters) was a South Korean hip hop quartet from Jungle Entertainment. Jungle Entertainment reported that 1.7 million USD was invested for the group's debut album since 2009. The album was personally produced and four tracks were part of a solo spin-off to show that each member can stand on their own. Their self-titled album, Most Incredible Busters, was released on October 25.

They officially disbanded on January 4, 2017.

Career

Pre-debut
As part of a spin-off style showcase, each member released the music video of their solo song. Starting with 5zic's "Beautiful Day" on October 6 and ending with Kang Nam's "Say My Name" on October 17. Before their debut performance on M! Countdown, they performed at the Muse Live at Music Hall to showcase their album.

2011–17: Most Incredible Busters, dorm accident, Illusion, and The Maginot Line and disbandment
On October 26, 2011, the group made their debut on M! Countdown with the song "G.D.M." (Girls, Dreams, Money) from their self-titled album Most Incredible Busters.

In January 2012, M.I.B. performed as the opening act for the Highlight Festival 2012, in which artists such as Jay Park and Far East Movement performed. M.I.B. also opened for will.i.am at will.i.am's special club performance in Seoul the following month. The group also stated that they were working on an album to be released in March.

On April 5, 2012, a fire broke out in the band's dorm. During the fire, three stylists were killed; two were killed immediately while the other died in the hospital in critical condition after regaining consciousness. As such, their comeback activities were postponed for nearly two months until the release of their EP, Illusion on May 30.

In 2013, M.I.B. embarked on their first tour in Japan, selling out concerts in Osaka, Nagoya, and Tokyo. The group also announced that they are working on their debut Japanese album.

On March 31, 2014, M.I.B. released their second studio album, The Maginot Line. The music video for the title track, "Chisa Bounce", was released on the same day.

On January 4, 2017, Signal Entertainment announced the disbandment of the group.

Members
 KangNam
 5Zic (Kim Han-gil )
 Young Cream (Kim Seo-An )
 Sims (Sim Jong-su )

Discography

Albums

Studio albums

Extended plays

Singles

References

External links
 M.I.B. on Daum Cafe

Musical groups established in 2011
South Korean hip hop groups
Musical quartets
Jungle Entertainment artists
2017 disestablishments in South Korea
Musical groups disestablished in 2017
2011 establishments in South Korea